The World Organisation for Animal Health (WOAH), formerly the  (OIE), is an intergovernmental organization coordinating, supporting and promoting animal disease control.

Mission and status 
The main objective of the WOAH is to control epizootic diseases and thus to prevent their spread. Other objectives consist of: transparency, scientific information, international solidarity, sanitary safety, the promotion of Veterinary Services, food safety and animal welfare. It is recognized as a reference organisation by the World Trade Organization (WTO) and in 2018 had a total of 182 member states. Its newest member state is Saint Lucia. The WOAH maintains permanent relations with 45 other international and regional organisations and has Regional and sub-regional Offices on every continent. The WOAH does not depend on the UN system; its autonomy is both institutional and financial and its activities are governed by its own constitutional texts. Since its first General Session held in Paris, the Organization carries out its work under the authority of a Committee consisting of delegates of the contracting Governments.

History 
The need to fight animal diseases at a global level led to the creation of the  through the international Agreement signed on January 25, 1924. Delegates at the International Conference on Epizootic Diseases of Domestic Animals, a May 1921 conference with diplomats from 43 countries, had called for the establishment of an international organization to coordinate responses against infectious animal diseases. The delegates were motivated by a rinderpest pandemic.

In May 2003, the Office became the World Organisation for Animal Health but kept its historical acronym OIE, which was in use until May 2022.

In December 2016, 430 delegates to the 4th Global Conference on Animal Welfare approved a range of measures aimed to improve animal welfare. An OIE strategy document which stemmed from this conference was to be presented for adoption at the OIE World Assembly in May 2017.

In January 2017, the outgoing Obama administration designated the OIE as an organization entitled to benefits of the International Organizations Immunities Act.

In May 2022, the Organization stopped using historical acronym OIE, and start to use new acronym WOAH.

Headquarters 

The WOAH's headquarters are located in Paris, in the 17th arrondissement. It was in 1939 that the WOAH moved to the aristocratic district of Parc Monceau, after having occupied premises since 1927 near the Champs de Mars and the Eiffel Tower, that had been provided by the French Higher Public Health Council. In May 1938, the WOAH Members gave Dr Emmanuel Leclainche, founder and first General Director of the WOAH, full powers to buy a townhouse in Paris, using the reserve fund. Dr Lecleinche chose the mansion from four properties selected by a Commission comprising the President of the WOAH, H.C.L.E. Berger (Netherlands), the vice-president, Carlo Bisanti (Italy), and the accountant, Gotlieb Flückiger (Switzerland). On 22 February 1939, the WOAH, represented by E. Leclainche bought the mansion from the Marquise de Montebello, at a cost of 700,000 francs.
The 13th General Session of the WOAH was held from 30 May to 5 June 1939, at 12 rue de Prony after rebuilding work had been completed. Due to the Second World War, the following General Session did not take place until 1946, from 2 to 5 October. Following their entry into Paris in June 1940, the German occupying forces temporarily closed and sealed the WOAH headquarters. The efforts of the President, Gotlieb Flückiger, elected in 1939, resulted in its re-opening.
12 rue de Prony was built in 1879, in the Neo-Renaissance style, by the celebrated architect Jean-Louis Pascal for the Austrian Baron, Jonas Königswater, a former banker and railway owner. A succession of major works to renovate and modernise the headquarters were undertaken by the Directors General elected after E.Leclainche: Gaston Ramon, René Vittoz, Louis Blajan, Jean Blancou and Bernard Vallat. Due to the headlong development of the organisation (tripling of the staff and the budget since 2001), additional premises have been rented at 14 rue de Prony since 2004. On 16 March 2009, the WOAH purchased a large part of the building at 14 rue de Prony, adjoining its headquarters.

World Animal Health Information Database (WAHID) interface 
Timely dissemination of information is crucial to containing outbreaks. The WAHID Interface provides access to all data held within WOAH's new World Animal Health Information System (WAHIS). It replaces and significantly extends the former web interface named Handistatus II System.

A comprehensive range of information is available from:
 Immediate notifications and follow-up reports submitted by Member Countries in response to exceptional disease events occurring in these countries as well as follow-up reports about these events,
 Six-monthly reports describing the WOAH-listed disease situations in each country,
 Annual reports providing further background information on animal health, on laboratory and vaccine production facilities.

See also
 Aquatic Animal Health Code
 Terrestrial Animal Health Code

References

External links 

 
 World Animal Health Information System Interface

Medical and health organizations based in France
Animal disease control
Veterinary organizations
Intergovernmental organizations
Organizations based in Paris
Veterinary medicine in France